R v Kouri 2005 SCC 81 (CanLII), was a decision of the Supreme Court of Canada that, along with its sister case R v Labaye, established that harm is the sole defining element of indecency in Canadian criminal law. The case involved a club in which couples engaged in group sex; the club was alleged to be a "common bawdy-house" (a house in which indecency or prostitution occurs).  The acquittal was upheld by the Supreme Court.

Background
In 1997, James Kouri, the owner of the Montreal club Coeur à Corps, was accused of operating a common bawdy-house and fined $7,500 under section 210(1) of the Criminal Code.  The fine came after undercover investigations of the club by police that started in 1996, although the club had been established in 1985.  The group sex club was for couples who, upon entering, would be asked if they were a "liberated couple."  Only those who replied in the affirmative could enter, and the couples would have to pay an entrance fee.

On appeal to the Quebec Court of Appeal, Mr. Kouri was acquitted.

Decision
The majority of the Supreme Court upheld the acquittal.  As the test for defining indecency, necessary in order to answer whether Mr. Kouri was guilty of operating a bawdy-house, was set out in R v Labaye, the Court in R v Kouri concentrated on whether sufficient measures were taken by Mr. Kouri so that the public was not exposed to something they would not want to see.  Had Mr. Kouri not done so, he might have been guilty of indecency.  The Court took the view that the Crown did not effectively prove its case against Mr. Kouri.

As the Court argued, the Crown had no evidence of anyone being forced to watch the sexual activities in the club, nor of anyone in the club being surprised to see group sex.  Whether a couple was a "liberated couple" was viewed as a "sufficiently clear and comprehensive" means to ensure only knowing and willing couples would enter, given the context of the outside of the club, which had sexually-themed images present.  It thus did not matter that there was no explicit cautionary message at the entrance that sexual conduct might be seen inside.

The Crown had also pushed its case against Mr. Kouri by saying that it was not known whether every couple was asked if they were "liberated" before they were admitted, and indeed some of the police had not been asked that question when they had entered the bar.  The police corroborated the evidence that not every couple was asked this with the anecdote that a woman once left the club "upset with her partner".

The Court responded to these concerns by noting that the fact that this woman became upset does not mean she was surprised to see sexual conduct in the club; there are other possible reasons for her unhappiness.  Even if she was unhappy to see group sex when the activity actually occurred, that does not prove she had not agreed to see this activity in the first place.  Moreover, while some police were not asked the "liberated couple" question, that did not prove that all other couples were not asked the question the first time they came to the club.

Mr. Kouri might also have been guilty of indecency had the club encouraged degrading views of certain people.  The Court, however, found no evidence that Mr. Kouri was guilty of this, noting that the activity was consensual and no money was exchanged between the persons having sex.  While there was an entrance fee, this was not paid to anyone for a sexual service, but rather to enter the club to use the bar and engage in sexual activity with others.

See also
 List of Supreme Court of Canada cases (McLachlin Court)

References

External links
 
 CBC news story

Canadian criminal case law
Supreme Court of Canada cases
2005 in Canadian case law